P18 may refer to:
 P18 (band), a French electronic music group
 CDKN2C, an enzyme
 Gotland Regiment, of the Swedish Army
 , a submarine of the Royal Navy
 Leukemia-associated phosphoprotein p18
 Oxon Hill–Fort Washington Line, a bus route of the Washington Metropolitan Area Transit Authority
 P-18 radar, a Soviet radar system
 Papago Army Heliport, in Maricopa County, Arizona, United States
 Papyrus 18, a biblical manuscript
 Rogak P-18, a pistol